Rzepin Pierwszy  is a village in the administrative district of Gmina Pawłów, within Starachowice County, Świętokrzyskie Voivodeship, in south-central Poland.

The village has a population of 600.

References

Rzepin Pierwszy
Radom Governorate
Kielce Voivodeship (1919–1939)